Bruce Kirby is the name of:
 Bruce Kirby (actor) (1925–2021), American actor
 Bruce Kirby (yacht designer) (1929–2021), Canadian yacht designer

See also
 Bruce Kirkby (born 1968), Canadian adventurer
 Kirby (surname)